In enzymology, a gamma-glutamylcyclotransferase is an enzyme that catalyzes the chemical reaction

(5-L-glutamyl)-L-amino acid  5-oxoproline + L-amino acid

Hence, this enzyme has one substrate, (5-L-glutamyl)-L-amino acid, and two products, 5-oxoproline and L-amino acid.

This enzyme belongs to the family of transferases, specifically the aminoacyltransferases.  The systematic name of this enzyme class is (5-L-glutamyl)-L-amino-acid 5-glutamyltransferase (cyclizing). Other names in common use include gamma-glutamyl-amino acid cyclotransferase, gamma-L-glutamylcyclotransferase, and L-glutamic cyclase.  This enzyme participates in glutathione metabolism.

Structural studies

References

 
 

EC 2.3.2
Enzymes of known structure